Hanauer is a surname. Notable people with the surname include:

Adrian Hanauer (born 1966), American businessman
Chip Hanauer (born 1954), American motorboat racer
J. E. Hanauer (1850–1938), Palestinian writer and photographer
Milton Hanauer (1908–1988), American chess player
Nick Hanauer (born 1959), American businessman